Chumik Kangri (also known as Chumik Point 22158) is a mountain peak located at  above sea level in the west of the Chumik Glacier.

Location 

Chumik Kangri is a key peak overlooking the Chumik Glacier and Gyong La Pass, part of Pakistan's Gilgit-Baltistan territory. Since 1989, the offshoots of this peak are occupied by Indian Army.

Climbing history 
No ascents of Chumik Kangri are documented.

References 

Mountains of the Karakoram
Wikipedia requested photographs by location